Namenlos (German for "nameless") is the eighth studio album from Austrian band L'Âme Immortelle.

Track listing
CD1: Namenlos

CD2: Erinnerung

References

2008 albums
L'Âme Immortelle albums